Holger Thiele (September 25, 1878 – June 5, 1946) was a Danish American astronomer and discoverer of minor planets and comets.

He was the son of Thorvald Nicolai Thiele (1838–1910), the noted Danish astronomer, actuary and mathematician, after whom the main-belt asteroid 1586 Thiele is named.

Holger Thiele is credited by the Minor Planet Center with the discovery of 4 numbered asteroids during 1914–1916. He also discovered the comet C/1906 V1 and calculated the orbits of other comets. He worked at Hamburg-Bergedorf Observatory at Bergedorf, in Hamburg, Germany. In 1912, he immigrated to the United States.

In 1917, he started working as a fellow for the University of California at Lick Observatory, near San Jose, California. Holger Thiele died in Alameda County in 1946.

Selected works 
 Corrected elements and ephemeris of minor planet 1924 TD (Baade) (University of California Press. 1925)
 Elements and ephemeris of Comet d 1927 (Stearns) (University of California Press. 1927)

References 
 

1878 births
1946 deaths
20th-century  American astronomers
20th-century Danish astronomers
Discoverers of asteroids
Discoverers of comets

Danish emigrants to the United States